A Lucky Strike is a 1915 American film featuring Oliver Hardy.

Cast
 Mae Hotely as Nora, the Cook
 Oliver Hardy as Bill Myers
 Cora Walker as Nelle Crehan
 Frances Ne Moyer as Elinor, her niece
 Jerold T. Hevener as Thomas Gray
 Ed Lawrence as His Assistant
 Raymond McKee as Clerk
 Ben Walker as Clerk

See also
 List of American films of 1915
 Oliver Hardy filmography

External links

1915 films
1915 short films
American silent short films
American black-and-white films
1915 comedy films
Films directed by Arthur Hotaling
Silent American comedy films
American comedy short films
1910s American films